Nguyễn Khang may refer to:

Nguyễn Khang (painter) (1912–1989), Vietnamese painter
Nguyễn Khang (politician) (1919–1976), organizer of the communists in Hanoi following the Japanese surrender in 1945
Nguyễn Khang, alternative name of Trần Thiêm Bình (d.1406), a pretender to the Vietnamese throne during the Hồ dynasty